Burenoceras is a genus of small, even tiny, Gasconadian cyrtoconic ellesmeroceratids in which the phragmocone—the chambered portion—is shorter that the living chamber.

In general form, Burenoceras is similar to Levisoceras, but much smaller. Two species, B. phragmoceroides and B. percompressum with contracted, slit-like apertures, are miniature forms resembling the much larger homeomorphic Silurian discosorid Phragmoceras and Devonian oncocerid Bolloceras.  Other Burenoceras have apertures that are variable straight sided or flaring.

Burenoceras is among what are referred to as microellesmeroceroids.

References

 Flower, R.H. 1964. The Nautiloid Order Ellesmerocerida (Cephalopoda); Memoir 12, New Mexico Bureau of Mines and Mineral Resources, Socorro N.M. 
 W. M. Furnish & Brian F. Glenister, 1964.  Nautiloidia – Ellesmerocerida. Treatise on Invertebrate Paleontology, Part K. Geological Society of America, Teichert and Moore (eds).

Prehistoric nautiloid genera
Ordovician cephalopods of Asia
Ordovician cephalopods of North America
Ellesmerocerida